In law, a conviction is the verdict reached by a court of law finding a defendant guilty of a crime. The opposite of a conviction is an acquittal (that is, "not guilty"). In Scotland, there can also be a verdict of "not proven", which is considered an acquittal. Sometimes, despite a defendant being found guilty, the court may order that the defendant not be convicted. This is known as a discharge and is used in countries such as England, Wales, Canada, Australia, and New Zealand.

The criminal justice system is not perfect and there are instances in which guilty defendants are acquitted and innocent people are convicted. Appeal mechanisms and post conviction relief procedures may help to address this issue to some extent. An error leading to the conviction of an innocent person is known as a miscarriage of justice.

After a defendant is convicted, the court determines the appropriate sentence as a punishment. In addition to the sentence, a conviction can also have other consequences, known as collateral consequences of criminal charges. These can include impacts on employment, housing, and other areas of an individual's life.

A minor conviction is a warning conviction that does not affect the defendant but serves as a warning.

A person's history of convictions is known as their antecedents or "previous" in the United Kingdom and "priors" in the United States and Australia.

See also
 Convict
 Verdict

References

Common law legal terminology
Criminal law legal terminology
Criminal law